Panipat Taraf Rajputan is a census town in Panipat district in the Indian state of Haryana.

Demographics
 India census, Panipat Taraf Rajputan had a population of 18,806. Males constitute 58% of the population and females 42%. Panipat Taraf Rajputan has an average literacy rate of 48%, lower than the national average of 59.5%: male literacy is 58%, and female literacy is 35%. In Panipat Taraf Rajputan, 18% of the population is under 6 years of age.

References

Cities and towns in Panipat district